Fernando de Valdés y Salas, (Salas, Asturias, 1483 – Madrid, 1568) was a Spanish churchman and jurist, professor of canon law at the University of Salamanca, and later its chancellor.

Biography 
He was member of the Supreme Council of the Spanish Inquisition from 1516, Bishop of Ourense (1529–1532), Bishop of Oviedo  (July 1532 – May 1539), Bishop of León,(1539), Bishop of Sigüenza (October 1539 – August 1546), Archbishop of Seville (August 1546 – December 1566), President of the Royal Council of Castile, Inquisitor General/Grand Inquisitor (1547–1566). He published an "Index of Forbidden books" in 1559, including Erasmus of Rotterdam (October 27, 1466/1469 – July 12, 1536), Frey Louis of Granada (Granada, 1505 – Lisbon, Portugal, December 31, 1588),  Saint Francisco de Borja ( 3 October 1510 – 28 September 1572), and other authors.

He tried to clean out heterodox people, associated to Jewish and Muslim "conversos" and Erasmist and Lutheran circles, discovered in 1558, from the high nobility and the high ecclesiastical positions around Valladolid and Sevilla, with the Archbishop of Toledo  (1558 – May 2, 1576), born in 1503 at Miranda de Arga, Navarre, Bartolomé Carranza.

References

Bibliography
J. R. ALONSO PEREIRA, "Historia General de la Arquitectura en Asturias". Colegio Oficial de Arquitectos de Asturias. Gran Enciclopedia Asturiana, (1996).(Gijón), Edit. Silverio Cañada, 366 pages, (In Spanish)

External links
Centros5.pntic.mec.es

1483 births
1568 deaths
People from Asturias
Spanish politicians
Bishops of León
Bishops of Ourense
Bishops of Sigüenza
Grand Inquisitors of Spain
16th-century Roman Catholic bishops in Spain
University of Salamanca alumni
Academic staff of the University of Salamanca